Suresh Haldankar was an Indian classical singer, actor and teacher.

Career
Born in Goa to a Daivajna family, Suresh Haldankar learned classical music from Jagannathbuwa Purohit, Ganpatrao Dewaskar and Manhar Barve. He performed in Marathi Sangeet Natak musicals and acted alongside Bal Gandharva. His most memorable performance was in the musical Honaji Bala who was based on shahir Honaji Bala. Acharya Atre conferred upon him the title of "Maharashtra Gandharva" after listening to his singing in Shri Ranga Kamala Kanta. Among his other popular songs are Vithu maza lekur wala and Govinda re gopala.

He conducted Indian classical music classes at Dadar.

References

Year of birth missing
Year of death missing
Male actors from Goa
Singers from Goa
Konkani people
Hindustani singers
Indian music educators
Marathi-language singers
Konkani-language singers
Male actors in Marathi cinema
20th-century Indian singers